John Deere , UK’s National Gardens Park  was launched in spring 2010.

The campaign is based on a recent survey which revealed that an average of 15% of UK gardeners would consider getting rid of their lawns to create hard landscaped driveways, additional parking spaces and home extensions. The aim of the campaign is to discourage homeowners from considering these options and educate them in the environmental benefits of having a lawn.

The campaign is currently supported by the RSBP and The Green Organisation.

It encourages like-minded individuals to sign up as members. The initiative aims to provide them with the knowledge and skills to enable them to personally improve their own and national environments by changing their attitudes towards to the garden lawn and their mowing habits.

References

Gardening in the United Kingdom
Projects established in 2010
John Deere